The Northern Lakes League (NLL), is an OHSAA high school athletic conference that was formed in 1956 and comprises eight high schools in Northwest Ohio.

Current members

Future members

On April 9, 2021, invitations were extended to four schools that are currently members of the Three Rivers Athletic Conference, starting with the 2023-2024 school year:  Findlay, Fremont Ross, Oregon Clay, and Whitmer.

Former members

League history

1950s
The Great Northern Conference had been created in 1945 with Oregon Clay, Maumee, Perrysburg, Rossford, Sylvania and Toledo Whitmer as its charter members.  Anthony Wayne would join them in 1953.  League expansion was brought up in 1956 as Bowling Green, Fostoria, Swanton, Oak Harbor, Genoa, Lake, Port Clinton, Toledo Rogers and Holland were considered for membership. The GNC eventually grew and split into two divisions based on size— Orange: (Bowling Green, Clay, Fostoria, Toledo Rogers, Sylvania, and Toledo Whitmer) and Blue: (Anthony Wayne, Genoa, Maumee, Perrysburg, Port Clinton and Rossford). The names were changed in 1957, with the Orange Division becoming the Great Lakes League and the Blue Division becoming the Northern Lakes League.

The NLL begins for the 1956-57 school year with Anthony Wayne, Genoa, Maumee, Perrysburg, Port Clinton, and Rossford as its charter members.
Eastwood joins in 1959 after being accepted in 1958.

1960s
Elmwood and Lake both join in 1960.
When Springfield (Holland HS until 1959) joins in 1962, the NLL will have its largest membership total at ten schools.  This would only last for the 1962-63 school year.
Port Clinton switches into the Great Lakes League (the Orange Division of the GNC) in 1963 after winning three football titles in 1957, 1960, and 1962.

1970s
For the 1972-73 school year, Eastwood, Elmwood, and Genoa leave to help form the Suburban Lakes League (SLL), leaving 6 members for a while.  Swanton and Napoleon were suggested as replacements.
Southview joins in 1976 after Sylvania High School splits.
Bowling Green leaves the GLL in 1978 to bring the league total to 8.

1980s
 The League membership remains consistent

1990s
For the 1996-97 school year, Lake leaves to join the SLL, and is replaced by Northview, who leaves the former Great Lakes League.  The football team remained in the GLL for the 1996 season before fully joining at season's end.
Around 1999, Rossford first considered leaving the NLL for a league with members closer in their size.  The 9-member SLL offered an opening, but Rossford initially declined.

2000s
In 2008, Rossford sent a letter of interest to be considered as the replacement for Lakota in the SLL, who left for the MAL in 2009.  The SLL could not get a 6-out-of-7 vote to accept Rossford, ensuring they would remain a member of the NLL for at least a few more years.  The NLL considered adding Clay and Napoleon to make a ten-school league, but a majority vote was not reached to expand.
In May 2009, Rossford's board of education voted unanimously to leave the Northern Lakes League and form the new Northern Buckeye Conference with Eastwood, Genoa, Lake, Otsego, and Woodmore, all schools that were withdrawing from the Suburban Lakes League.  Later additions to the NBC included Elmwood and Fostoria.  The new league began competition in the fall of 2011.
In June 2009, Napoleon High School accepted the invitation to join the Northern Lakes League in 2011 as the replacement for Rossford.
In August 2009, Maumee's school board voted 3-2 to remain members of the Northern Lakes League and to not accept the NBC's invitation to join their new league.

2020s
In January 2021, the NLL announced a plan to expand the league to 16 members, with two divisions of eight schools each based on enrollment.  Any schools interested in membership were invited to apply, and it was hinted that expansion would most likely affect the Three Rivers Athletic Conference (TRAC) more than any other leagues.
On March 22, 2021, Maumee's school board voted unanimously to leave the NLL and join the Northern Buckeye Conference no later than the 2023-24 school year as a replacement for Elmwood High School.
On April 9, 2021, the seven remaining NLL schools sent invitations to four schools that are currently members of the TRAC:  Findlay, Fremont Ross, Oregon Clay, and Whitmer. Fremont Ross voted to accept the invitation on April 12, followed by Findlay on April 19, Clay on April 20, and Whitmer on April 21.
On November 11, 2022, the NLL announced their division names and alignments for the 2023-24 through 2026-27 school years.  The Buckeye Division will be for the larger schools and the Cardinal Division will be for the smaller schools, with a slightly different alignment for football.  School enrollment will be considered every two years for reorganizing and balancing the divisions.

All-time membership

Football champions

See also
Ohio High School Athletic Conferences

References

External links
List of NLL Football Champions
5 from SLL join Rossford for new league
Napoleon replaces Rossford in NLL
NLL Basketball Standings with 10 Members, Toledo Blade, January 26 1963

Ohio high school sports conferences
Sports leagues established in 1956
1956 establishments in Ohio